Sao Saw Et (lit: Saturday the 21st, in Northern Thai) was the discrimination against LGBT in Thailand that consists of hate speeches and violent attempts to cancel the 2009 Pride Parade in Chiang Mai Province of which was scheduled to take place on 21 February 2009. It was considered an important event in history of Thai LGBT and was compared to the Stonewall Riots in the US. The date, 21 February, was annually observed as the day against violence against LGBT in Thailand amongst the activists.

Incidents 
The Chiang Mai Gay Parade was initially organised by 22 LGBT organisations with the scheduled date of 21 February 2009. The parade would start from The Buddhist monastery Phutthasathan Chiang Mai and the nearby Wat Uppakhut and march along the Chang Khlan Road through the Chiang Mai Night Bazaar, starting from 18.00.

However, after the event was announced, various groups of people including several LGBT activists leading by Nathee Theerarotchanaphong; a Thai conservative LGBT and political activist, began to call for the local government agencies to step in for cancellation of the event. Amongst the reasons given for the parade to be cancelled are: “destroying the beautiful Lanna culture“, “causing the youths to imitate the [LGBT] behaviours”. Local government officials, including the province governor and the head of cultural division inclined towards the cancellation. Moreover, local news agencies and radio stations at the time were reported to spread hate speeches towards the LGBTs and even incite the crowds to throw things and block the parade route.

On the scheduled date, 21 February 2009, the parade organisers and participants gathered inside of the Phutthasathan Chiang Mai Monastery to prepare the parade. Around 16.00, a politically-inclined Red Shirt group called the Rak Chiang Mai 51 Group, armed, gathered around the gate of the monastery, constraining the parade participants inside. The armed group that has reportedly to consist of a thousand people, put up the banners and using speakers to curse the LGBTs trapped inside the blockade. Some parade organisers were reportedly injured from the stone-throwers. A troop of 100 police officers later arrived at the scene, doing nothing to stop the ongoing violence. The officers, indeed, called for the parade organisers to cancel the parade and apologise to the infuriating crowds. The parade organisers finally apologise to the crowd and cancel the parade after four hours of aggression from the armed crowds, for the sake of the parade participants who were reportedly nervous.

The calls for the parade cancellations varies from mild “allowing the parade to be held only with the term Gay to be removed from the event’s name”, to more aggressive ones like “prohibiting such event to be held in Chiang Mai for other 1,500 years.

Aftermath 
The group called Sao Saw Et was formed in order to educate people on peaceful living with LGBT and eliminating the violence against LGBT people.

References

2009 in Chiang Mai
LGBT-related riots
2009 in Thailand
Violence against LGBT people in Asia
2009 in LGBT history